Harimau Muda A was the club name for the former Malaysia Under-22 National Football Team, representing Malaysia in international football competitions such as the AFC U-22 Asian Cup, Champions Youth Cup as well as other under-22 international football tournaments. It was managed by Football Association of Malaysia. The squad was the feeder team for Malaysia U-23 and senior national football team. In 2015, Harimau Muda once again became a single team composed of former Harimau Muda A & B players. On 25 November 2015, it was confirmed that the club was disbanded by FAM which meant that all the players were returned to their own state sides.

Harimau Muda A last competed in Australia's National Premier Leagues Queensland, having lastly participated in a domestic league competition is the 2012 S. League. The team was aimed at developing Malaysian youth players and does not recruit any foreign nationals in its squad. The name "Harimau Muda" means "Young Tigers" in English.

History 
On 19 October 2007, FAM decided to include Malaysia U-21 as one of the team in 2007–08 Premier League Malaysia and will be known as Harimau Muda (Young Tigers). Due to international duties, the Malaysia national U-21 team were needed to participate in the 2010 AFC U-19 Championship qualification. In local competition, they participated in the Premier League and the FA Cup.

The Harimau Muda were split into 2 teams in July 2009, Harimau Muda A and Harimau Muda B. The Harimau Muda B were sent to Zibo, China to participate in the 2010 AFC U-19 Championship qualification and Harimau Muda A was to participate in the Premier League and FA Cup.

During the 2010 season, Harimau Muda A went to a training camp in Zlaté Moravce, Slovakia for 8 months while Harimau Muda B participated in the 2010 Malaysia Premier League.

After the stint in Slovakia, Harimau Muda A joined the 2011 Super League Malaysia replacing KL PLUS FC and Harimau Muda B continued to play in the Malaysia Premier League. Harimau Muda A finished 5th while Harimau Muda B played their worst season being in the bottom 3. However, they managed to avoid relegation and will continue to play in the Malaysia Premier League.

For the 2012 season, Harimau Muda A swapped places with the Young Lions of Singapore, which is made up of the Singapore's national under-23 team. Young Lions will replace Harimau Muda A in the Super League while the Harimau Muda A will replace the Young Lions in the S. League. Harimau Muda B will continue to participate in the Malaysia Premier League.

For the 2012 S. League season, Harimau Muda A will continue to use their training centre and main headquarters at Wisma FAM, Kelana Jaya as always, however for the league matches, Harimau Muda A will be based at the Yishun Stadium in Yishun, Singapore. Like the rest of the teams that are participating in the 2012 season, Harimau Muda A will be sponsored by Yeo's H-TWO-O Original. The logo will be printed on the back of the Harimau Muda A's home and away kit.

In 2013, The Football Association of Malaysia agreed to replace Harimau Muda A with Harimau Muda B in the 2013 S.League campaign. Instead, Harimau Muda A will undergo an 8 month long training in central Europe and will be mainly based at Zlaté Moravce, Slovakia to prepare to defend their title in the 2013 Southeast Asian Games. Harimau Muda B will use aged under- 20 players for the S. League with no foreign players and will be based in the Pasir Gudang Stadium, replacing Yishun Stadium as their previous home stadium.

After a year without club competition, Harimau Muda A was competing in the Australia's National Premier Leagues Queensland, starting in the 2014 season. This follows an announcement of the agreement between FA of Malaysia and Football Queensland of Australia on 14 January 2014. For their participation in the NPL Queensland, Harimau Muda A does not have a 'home ground' like other teams; instead, all their matches will be played as away matches at the opponent's ground. They also are not eligible for the end-of-season playoffs for the NPL championship, and also cannot participate in the FFA Cup.

In 2015, Youth and Sports Minister Khairy Jamaluddin, former FAM's Deputy President has stated that the Football Association of Malaysia (FAM) must disband the Harimau Muda system, stating the Harimau Muda system is no longer relevant, it was not planned for the long term, and the state football associations should take the responsibility to groom potential players. The new Harimau Muda participated and won the 2015 Bangabandhu Cup, their first international tournament.

Competition records

Honours

Domestic 
 Malaysia Premier League
 Winners (1): 2009

International 
 AFC Youth Championship
 Runner-up (3): 1959, 1960, 1968
 Third place (1): 1965
 Fourth place (1): 1962
 AFF Youth Championship
 Runner-up (3): 2005, 2006, 2007
 Third place (1): 2011
 Fourth place (1): 2009

Others 
 International U-21 Football Tournament Thanh Nien Cup
 Winners (1): 2012

International records

FIFA World Youth Championship record 

**Red border colour indicates tournament was held on home soil.

<div style="text-align:left">

AFC Youth Championship record 

**Red border colour indicates tournament was held on home soil.

AFF Youth Championship record 

**Red border colour indicates tournament was held on home soil.

Hassanal Bolkiah Trophy Record

 Malaysia sent Harimau Muda B beginning from 2012 edition.

Coaches

Affiliated clubs 
  Harimau Muda (football team)
  Harimau Muda C
  Bukit Jalil Sports School
  Zlaté Moravce
  Tengku Mahkota Ismail Sports School
  Malaysia Pahang Sports School

See also 
 Harimau Muda (football team)
 Harimau Muda C

References

External links 
 Football Association of Malaysia
 Football Queensland / National Premier Leagues Queensland

Malaysia national football team
Association football clubs established in 2009
Defunct football clubs in Malaysia
National Premier Leagues clubs
Singapore Premier League clubs